Walden Ponds Wildlife Habitat is a  Boulder County, Colorado park. It was reclaimed between 1974 and the 1990s from an open-pit gravel mine on the site, and is named after Walden "Wally" Toevs, the Boulder County Commissioner who spearheaded the plan to convert the gravel pits into a wildlife habitat.

After the mining ceased and the property had been stripped  down to bedrock, all that was left were open pits and puddles of ground water.

The park has several ponds and marshlands, hiking trails, picnic facilities, restrooms, and fishing. It claims to be one of the best bird-watching areas in Boulder County.

References

External links 
 Boulder County Parks website

Regional parks in the United States